Ablation casting is a variation of sand casting involving a soluble binder. The mold is dissolved and washed away, allowing rapid cooling of the casting.

References  

Casting (manufacturing)